Events in the year 2022 in Peru.

Incumbents 
 President: 
 Pedro Castillo (until 7 December)
 Dina Boluarte (from 7 December)
 Prime Minister: 
 Mirtha Vásquez (until 1 February)
 Héctor Valer (1 February - 8 February)
 Aníbal Torres (8 February - 26 November)
 Betssy Chávez (26 November - 7 December)
 Pedro Angulo Arana (11 December - 21 December)
 Alberto Otárola (from 21 December)

Events 

2 March – Peru voted on a United Nations resolution condemning Russia for its invasion of Ukraine.
29 March – The protests occur due to COVID-19 and the 2022 Russian invasion of Ukraine.
 4 August – Prime minister Aníbal Torres, resigns during multiple criminal investigations against President Pedro Castillo, however Castillo rejected his resignation.
 5 October – One person is killed and 2 others are injured by a magnitude 5.8 earthquake in Piura.
 18 November – LATAM Perú Flight 2213
 26 November – Prime minister Aníbal Torres, resigns again, and was replaced by Betssy Chávez
 7 December – 2022 Peruvian self-coup attempt:
 Peruvian President Pedro Castillo announces the dissolution of the Congress of the Republic, the imposition of a curfew, the creation of an "emergency" government and early parliamentary election hours before his third impeachment attempt. He is arrested shortly after he leaves the Government Palace.
 Prime Minister Betssy Chávez announces her resignation.
 Peruvian First Vice President Dina Boluarte sworn in as president after Castillo's arrest.
 Protests erupt across Peru following the ousting of President Pedro Castillo. Dozens are injured and many are taken hostages during the commotion.
14 December - President Boluarte declares 30-day of state emergency and deploys military throughout Peru following violent protests.
15 December - The army opens fire at protestors in Ayacucho, killing 9 and injuring 55.
16 December - Peruvian Minister of Education Patricia Correa and Culture Minister Jair Pérez resign from their position due to rising casualties in the protests.

Sport 
 Peru at the 2022 Winter Olympics

Deaths 

 12 January – Luis Castañeda, politician (born 1945).
 21 May - Heddy Honigmann, documentary filmmaker (born 1951)
 14 July - Francisco Morales-Bermúdez, 112th Prime Minister and 51st President of Peru (born 1921)
 4 August - Diego Bertie, musician and actor (born 1967)
 8 December - Martha Hildebrandt, linguist and politician (born 1925)

References 

 
Peru
Peru
2020s in Peru
Years of the 21st century in Peru